Juan Jorge Giha Yarur (born 23 April 1955) is a Chilean-born Peruvian sports shooter and Olympic medalist. A six-time Olympian, he won a silver medal in Skeet Shooting at the 1992 Summer Olympics in Barcelona, second after gold-winner Zhang Shan.

Biography
Born in Santiago, Chile, he is the son of Juan Giha Ali and Nelly Yarur, and brother of José Luis, Nicolas, Nelly Cecilia and Nathalie. He went to Inmaculado Corazon School up to third grade and then attended Santa Maria High School where he finished his studies. He then attended the Universidad de Lima where he obtained a bachelor's degree in Industrial Engineering. In 1982, he married Joyce Abusada. In 1989, they had a son who they named Juan Ricardo. In the years to come, he would prepare himself for his conquest in 1992, where he obtained the Silver medal in the Barcelona, Spain 1992 Olympic Games.

Further in his career, after several triumphs like 27 consecutive national championships wins, Panamerican games, twice South American Championships, and other remarkable triumphs, in 1997, he accomplished a record-winning achievement. During the second half of the year, he would win several shooting events. Starting with the Bolivarian Games in Arequipa, Peru with  Skeet record, one week after wins South American competition in Santiago Chile named Eulogio Pasten Leiva, a well known competition and following this events He  achieves one of His most coveted trophies, Bronze medal in world Championship held in Lima Peru on end of October 1997, after breath taking shootoff that lasted thirty minutes, against Tamaz Imainsvilli from Georgia and Joe Buffa from USA . In this competition, renowned shooters like Al-Rashidi from Kuwait and Ennio Falco from Italy would attain the first and second places.

Currently, he coaches several shooters from around the world. He has travelled to India, Argentina, Chile, Ecuador and Mexico to coach several professional shooters. Currently Juan is developing a special program with young shooters from Chile looking towards the next Olympic Games held in 2012.

Olympic results

References

  

1955 births
Living people
Sportspeople from Santiago
Peruvian male sport shooters
Peruvian people of Palestinian descent
Skeet shooters
Shooters at the 1980 Summer Olympics
Shooters at the 1984 Summer Olympics
Shooters at the 1988 Summer Olympics
Shooters at the 1992 Summer Olympics
Shooters at the 1996 Summer Olympics
Shooters at the 2000 Summer Olympics
Olympic shooters of Peru
Olympic silver medalists for Peru
Olympic medalists in shooting
Chilean emigrants to Peru

Medalists at the 1992 Summer Olympics
20th-century Peruvian people
21st-century Peruvian people